Potumoe Leavasa, better known as Potu Leavasa, (born 27 November 1971 in Apia) is a Samoan former rugby union player who played as a lock and coach.

Career
He was selected for the Hurricanes in 1997 on the strength of a strong 1996 NPC season with Hawke’s Bay and an impressive tour to Britain with Western Samoa that followed.

His only appearance in the  Super 12 competition was when he came as a flanker against the Crusaders in the second round.

Leavasa played for the Central Vikings five times in 1997, previously capped 29 times for Hawke’s Bay.

His first cap for Samoa was during a match against Tonga, at Nuku'alofa, on 29 May 1993. He was part of the 1995 Rugby World Cup roster, playing three matches. Leavasa took also part to the 1996 Samoa tour to Britain.  His last international cap was during a match against South Africa, at Pretoria, on 6 July 2002.

Coaching career
Since 2016 he has been working in the coaching staff of the second national team of Samoa, preparing it for matches in the framework of the Americas Pacific Challenge. He holds the post of backs coach under Brian Lima as head of the coaching staff.

Personal life
He is father of Potu Leavasa Jr. (born 1996), also a rugby player, who plays as lock for Samoa A national team. He was formed at the Melbourne Rebels Academy and was recruited by the Warringah Rats. 

In 1997, Leavasa Sr. was a suspect in the case of the rape of a woman by one of the Hurricanes players in Durban.

References

External links
Potu Leavasa international statistics
Peter L. Leavasa international statistics

1971 births
Living people
Sportspeople from Apia
Samoan rugby union players
Samoan expatriates in New Zealand
Rugby union locks
Samoa international rugby union players